La Cartuja de Monegros is a locality located in the municipality of Sariñena, in Huesca province, Aragon, Spain. As of 2020, it has a population of 266.

Geography 
La Cartuja de Monegros is located 67km south-southeast of Huesca.

References

Populated places in the Province of Huesca